USS LST-553 was a United States Navy  in commission from 1944 to 1947.

Construction and commissioning
LST-553 was laid down on 24 January 1944 at Evansville, Indiana, by the Missouri Valley Bridge and Iron Company. She was launched on 16 March 1944, sponsored by Miss Agnes L. Maulding, and commissioned on 22 April 1944.

Service history
During World War II, LST-553 was assigned to the Pacific Theater of Operations.  She participated in the capture and occupation of the southern Palau Islands in September and October 1944.  She then took part in the Philippines campaign, participating in the Leyte landings in October and November 1944, the Lingayen Gulf landings in January 1945, and the landings at Zambales and Subic Bay in January 1945. She then participated in the assault on and occupation of Okinawa Gunto from April through June 1945.

Following the war, LST-553, commanded by Lieutenant William George Keat, conducted minesweeping operations in the waters surrounding the Home Islands of Japanin the Port of Yokohoma and performed occupation duty in the Far East (South China Sea) until late January 1947. Minesweeping Operations were conducted with mattresses padding the wheel house to buffer personnel from detonating mines, and occupation duties included survey visits by ships officers to both Hiroshima and Nagasaki. On 22 September 1945, she struck a mine and sank, but she was refloated and returned to service.

Decommissioning and disposal
LST-553 was decommissioned on 13 February 1947 and transferred to the United States Army at Yokohama, Japan, the same day. She was stricken from the Navy List on 25 April 1947.

Honors and awards

LST-553 received five battle stars for her World War II service.

References

NavSource Online: Amphibious Photo Archive LST-553

 

LST-542-class tank landing ships
World War II amphibious warfare vessels of the United States
Ships built in Evansville, Indiana
1944 ships
Maritime incidents in September 1945